
Gmina Brzozie is a rural gmina (administrative district) in Brodnica County, Kuyavian-Pomeranian Voivodeship, in north-central Poland.

The gmina contains part of the protected area called Górzno-Lidzbark Landscape Park.

Villages
Gmina Brzozie contains the villages and settlements of Brzozie, Jajkowo, Janówko, Małe Leźno, Mały Głęboczek, Sugajno, Świecie, Trepki, Wielki Głęboczek, Wielkie Leźno and Zembrze.

Neighbouring gminas
Gmina Brzozie is bordered by the gminas of Bartniczka, Brodnica, Grodziczno, Kurzętnik, Lidzbark and Zbiczno.

References

Polish official population figures 2006

Brzozie
Brodnica County